Te Ador is the second solo studio album by Romanian singer Elena Gheorghe. It was released in July 2008 in Romania and features the singles "Te Ador" (I Love You) & "Până La Stele" (Up To The Stars). A repackaged "Special Edition" was released in May 2009 featuring the single "The Balkan Girls", Elena's entry in the 2009 Eurovision Song Contest.

Track list 
Standard Edition:

 "Te Ador" 03:43 (composition Laurenţiu Duţă/Ovidiu Bistriceanu/Daris Mangal; music-line Laurenţiu Duţă, Ovidiu Bistriceanu)
 "O Nouă Viaţă" 03:27 (composition Laurenţiu Duţă/Ovidiu Bistriceanu/Daris Mangal; music-line Laurenţiu Duţă, Ovidiu Bistriceanu)
 "Jumătate" 03:55 (composition & music-line Adi Cristescu)
 "Până La Stele" 03:36 (composition Laurenţiu Duţă/Ovidiu Bistriceanu/Daris Mangal; music-line Laurenţiu Duţă, Ovidiu Bistriceanu/Dorin Topală)
 "Tot Ce Vreau" 03:46 (composition Adi Cristescu; music-line Adi Cristescu/Remus Petruţ)
 "Spune-Mi" 03:24 (composition & music-line Adi Cristescu/ Florian Ghiurluc)
"Lângă Mine" 03:08 (composition Gabriel Huiban/Adi Colceru; music-line Alex Pelin)
 "Promisiuni" 03:10 (composition Laurenţiu Duţă/Ovidiu Bistriceanu/Daris Mangal; music-line Laurenţiu Duţă, Ovidiu Bistriceanu)
 "Zile Şi Nopti" 03:17 (composition Laurenţiu Duţă/Ovidiu Bistriceanu/Daris Mangal; music-line Laurenţiu Duţu, Ovidiu Bistriceanu/Dorin ţopală)
 "My Superstar" 04:00 (composition Adi Cristescu/Constinel Ghiorghiulescu; music-line Adi Cristescu/Ciro de Luca)
 "I Love You" 03:50 (composition & music-line Ionuţ Radu)

Special Edition (Editie Speciala):

 "The Balkan Girls" 02:49 (Duţă/Bistriceanu/Mangal - Duţă & Pelin)
 "The Balkan Girls (David Dee Jay Club Remix)" 04:02 (Duţă/Bistriceanu/Mangal - Duţă & Pelin)
 "The Balkan Girls (DJ Daronee Remix) 03:28 (Duţă/Bistriceanu/Mangal - Duţă & Pelin)
 "Te Ador" 03:43 (Duţă/Bistriceanu/Mangal - Duţă)
 "O Nouă Viaţă" 03:27 (Duţă/Bistriceanu/Mangal - Duţă)
 "Jumătate" 03:55 (Cristescu)
 "Până La Stele" 03:36 (Duţă/Bistriceanu/Mangal - Duţă/Topală)
 "Tot Ce Vreau" 03:46 (Cristescu - Cristescu/Petruţ)
 "Spune-Mi" 03:24 (Cristescu/Ghiurluc)
 "Lângă Mine" 03:08 (Huiban/Colceru - Pelin)
 "Promisiuni" 03:10 (Duţă/Bistriceanu/Mangal - Duţă)
 "Zile Şi Nopti" 03:17 (Duţă/Bistriceanu/Mangal - Duţă/Topală)
 "My Superstar" 04:00 (Cristescu/Ghiorghiulescu - Cristescu/ Ciro de Luca)
 "I Love You" 03:50 (Radu)
 "Te Ador" (Video)

2008 albums
Elena Gheorghe albums